Mickey is a given name, nickname and surname. 

Mickey may also refer to:

Arts and entertainment
 Mickey (1918 film), a silent film starring Mabel Normand, directed by F. Richard Jones
 Mickey (1948 film), starring Lois Butler, based on the 1946 novel Clementine by Peggy Goodin
 Mickey (TV series), a 1964–1965 TV series starring Mickey Rooney
 "Mickey" (Toni Basil song), 1981
 Mickey (2004 film), a baseball film starring Harry Connick, Jr.
 "Mickey" (Lil Yachty song), 2018

Computing and technology
 MICKEY, a stream cipher algorithm that is part of the eSTREAM portfolio
 Mouse dpi or mickey, a measure of distance reported by a computer mouse
 Mickey or 1850XLD, which was developed into the Atari ST home computer
 Mickey set, H2X American ground scanning radar

Other uses
 Mickey Finn (drugs) or mickey, a drink laced with drugs
 Mickey, a Canadian slang term for a 375 mL bottle of liquor
 Mickey Hot Springs, a small hot spring system in Oregon, United States